Ackerley is a surname. People with this surname include:

 Alvin Ackerley (1927–1973), English rugby league footballer
 Barry Ackerley (1934–2011), American media and sports owner
 David Ackerly (born 1960), Australian footballer
 Ernie Ackerley (1943–2017), English footballer
 Frederick Ackerley (1871–1954), British Anglican priest
 George Ackerley (1887–1958), English footballer
 J. Christopher Ackerley, American politician
 J. R. Ackerley (1896–1967), English writer and editor
 Michelle Ackerley (born 1984), English television presenter
 Paul Ackerley (1949–2011), New Zealand field hockey player
 Stan Ackerley (born 1942), English–Australian association footballer

See also
Ackerley Group, an American media company owned by Barry Ackerley
J. R. Ackerley Prize for Autobiography, a British prize awarded by PEN, established by sister of J. R. Ackerley